Botanical gardens in the United Kingdom is a link page for any botanical garden, arboretum or pinetum in the United Kingdom.

England

Berkshire
Harris Garden, University of Reading, Reading

Birmingham
Birmingham Botanical Gardens
Winterbourne Botanic Garden, University of Birmingham

Bristol
Bristol University Botanic Gardens

Cambridgeshire
Cambridge University Botanic Garden, Cambridge

Cheshire
Jodrell Bank Arboretum
Ness Botanic Gardens

Cornwall
Lost Gardens of Heligan
Eden Project

County Durham
University of Durham Botanic Garden

Derby
Derby Arboretum

Devon
Bicton Gardens
Paignton Botanical Gardens

Dorset
Abbotsbury Subtropical Gardens

Gloucestershire and South Gloucestershire
Batsford Arboretum
Tortworth Court Arboretum
Westonbirt Arboretum, Tetbury

Hampshire
Exbury Gardens, Exbury
Sir Harold Hillier Gardens, Romsey

Hertfordshire
Physic Garden, Hitchin

Isles of Scilly
Abbey Gardens, Tresco

Isle of Wight
Ventnor Botanic Garden, Ventnor

Kent
Bedgebury National Pinetum

Lancashire

Leicestershire
University of Leicester Botanic Garden, Oadby

London
Chelsea Physic Garden, Chelsea
Royal Botanic Gardens, Kew
Medicinal Plant Garden, Royal College of Physicians of London, Regents Park

Manchester
Bridgewatergarden Salford
Firs Botanical Grounds Fallowfield
Fletcher Moss Botanical Garden Didsbury

Merseyside
Wavertree Botanic Park and Gardens, Liverpool
Calderstones/Harthill estate, Liverpool
Southport Botanic Gardens

Newcastle upon Tyne
Moorbank Botanic Gardens, Newcastle University

North Yorkshire
Thorp Perrow Arboretum, Bedale
The Yorkshire Arboretum, Nr Malton
Museum Gardens, York

Northamptonshire
Thenford House Arboretum, Thenford

Nottinghamshire
The Arboretum, Nottingham

Oxfordshire
University of Oxford Botanic Garden, Oxford
Harcourt Arboretum, Nuneham Courtenay

Staffordshire
National Memorial Arboretum, Alrewas

South Yorkshire
Sheffield Botanical Gardens, Sheffield

Surrey
Royal Botanic Gardens, Kew
Royal Horticultural Society Gardens, Wisley 
Winkworth Arboretum

West Sussex
Wakehurst Place (outstation of Royal Botanic Gardens, Kew)
Borde Hill Garden, Haywards Heath

Worcestershire
Bodenham Arboretum

Scotland

Aberdeen
Cruickshank Botanic Garden, Aberdeen

Argyll
Benmore Botanic Garden, near Dunoon, first outstation of the Royal Botanic Garden Edinburgh
Crarae Gardens, Inveraray

Dundee
University of Dundee Botanic Garden

Edinburgh
Royal Botanic Garden Edinburgh. The main site is in Edinburgh at Inverleith, with three "Regional Gardens":
Benmore Botanic Garden in Argyll, formerly known as the Younger Botanic Garden
Dawyck Botanic Garden in the Scottish Borders
Logan Botanic Garden in Galloway

Fife
St Andrews Botanic Garden

Galloway
Logan Botanic Garden, Port Logan, regional garden of the Royal Botanic Garden Edinburgh

Glasgow
Glasgow Botanic Gardens

Inverness
Inverness Botanic Gardens

Scottish Borders
Dawyck Botanic Garden near Peebles,  regional garden of the Royal Botanic Garden Edinburgh

Wales

Carmarthenshire
National Botanic Garden of Wales

Grove / Gelli Aur Arboretum

Ceredigion
Aberystwyth University Botanic Garden - Penglais

Gwynedd
Treborth Botanic Garden - Bangor University

Vale of Glamorgan
Cowbridge Physic Garden

Swansea
Clyne Gardens 
Singleton Botanical Gardens

Northern Ireland

Belfast
Belfast Botanic Gardens

See also
Botanical garden
List of botanical gardens
The United Kingdom has a strong tradition of decorative gardening, and there are many well known gardens in the United Kingdom that are not botanical gardens. See: 
Gardens in England
Gardens in Scotland
Gardens in Wales
Gardens in Northern Ireland

 
United Kingdom
Botanical gardens
Botanical gardens